Kolayat  is a town in the Bikaner district of the Indian state of Rajasthan. It is also the headquarters of the eponymous tehsil.

History
Kolayat is an historical centre of pilgrimage where the Vedic sage, Kapila is believed by some to have shed his body under a Peepul tree. Kolayat has a number of marble temples, sandstone pavilions and 52 ghats (bathing places) built around a large artificial lake.

A temple dedicated to Kapila is the venue for an annual fair held in the month of Kartik (October - November). During full moon of this month thousands of devotees of the Sankhya philosophy gather to take a dip in Kapil Sarovar. Devotees believe the lake has the power to wash away their sins. A livestock fair, mainly for the trading of camels is part of the festivities.

Mineral Exploration Corporation Limited (MECL) had an office at Kolayat, functioning until 1997. It was wound up after the end of mineral exploration activities in the surrounding areas.

Demographics
 India census, Kolayat had a population of 7,346, of which 3,963 were male and 3,383 female.

Attractions 
Water Gateways
Kolayat Lake

Historical places
KapilMuni Vatika

References

External links
 Kapil Muni Fair

Bikaner district
Cities and towns in Bikaner district